Fazel Hadi Muslimyar is a politician from Afghanistan who served as President, Speaker and Chairman of House of Elders.

References 

Presidents of the House of Elders (Afghanistan)
Year of birth missing (living people)
Living people